City of Evil is the third studio album by American heavy metal band Avenged Sevenfold, released on June 6, 2005, through Warner Bros. Records. Co-produced by Andrew Murdock, City of Evil contains a more traditional heavy metal and hard rock sound than Avenged Sevenfold's previous two albums, which showcased a predominantly metalcore sound. The album title is derived from a lyric in the song, "Beast and the Harlot". The album is notable for the absence of screaming vocals. M. Shadows worked for months before the album's release with vocal coach Ron Anderson, whose clients have included Axl Rose and Chris Cornell, to achieve a sound that had "grit while still having the tone". In order to increase stamina and strength on the pedals, The Rev would sit for hours practicing until he could get up to 210 beats per minute.

The album contains some of Avenged Sevenfold's most popular and famous songs, including "Bat Country", which is arguably their most successful to date, being one of their two singles certified Gold by the RIAA. City of Evil was very successful after its release, debuting at number 30 on the Billboard 200 chart and has been certified platinum by the Recording Industry Association of America in the United States and gold in both Canada and the United Kingdom. It went on to sell over 1,500,000 copies in the United States, and 2,500,000 total worldwide, making it the best-selling album out of Avenged Sevenfold's discography as of 2020. "Burn It Down", "Bat Country", "Beast and the Harlot" and "Seize the Day" were also released as music videos, directed by Marc Klasfeld, Tony Petrossian, and Wayne Isham, respectively. "Blinded in Chains" was also featured in the video game, Need For Speed: Most Wanted, and is also the theme of the Blacklist member, Vince "Taz" Kilic and the promo of the Japanese-Canadian anime Bakugan Battle Brawlers on TV3.

The album was ranked No. 63 on Guitar World magazine's "100 Greatest Guitar Albums of All Time". City of Evil also appears in Kerrang!s "666 Albums You Must Hear Before You Die" and "50 Albums You Need To Hear Before You Die". The album was ranked No. 35 in Kerrangs list of "50 Greatest Metal Albums Ever" in 2016. Rolling Stone listed the album at No. 100 on its list of The 100 Greatest Metal Albums of All Time.

History 
Previously, Avenged Sevenfold had written and released two albums, Sounding the Seventh Trumpet in 2001 and Waking the Fallen in 2003, under the Goodlife Records and the Hopeless Records labels, respectively. Although neither album was a smash hit, the latter has been certified gold by the RIAA. Waking the Fallen attracted several major record labels to the band, and eventually they signed with Warner Bros. Records after consideration of several others.

Musical changes 
When they began to write the album, Avenged Sevenfold turned to their influences for a change in style. The album abandons the band's metalcore sound. "When we started working on this record, we said, 'You know what? None of our favorite bands are super extreme, they just write really good melodic songs that are still heavy," said singer M. Shadows in an interview. The album is partially influenced by European power metal bands such as Blind Guardian, Sonata Arctica and Helloween, as well as Children of Bodom.

M. Shadows' vocal changes 
Shadows turned to Ron Anderson, a vocal coach that had previously worked with Axl Rose and Chris Cornell. Shadows was specifically looking to add a more gritty, raspy tone to his voice and worked with Anderson for several months on this before City of Evil was recorded. This change resulted in newly established vocal contributions from each band member during live performances, and remained prevalent on every record the band has released since 2005. 

"Ron taught me how to have that grit to my voice while still having the tone. He brought all of that to the table and he brought that technique to my voice. I’ve worked with him for about a year and a half now, but I worked with him for nine months before the record," said Shadows, "I told him that I want my voice to sound different from everybody else, but I wanted those characteristics in my voice...It was one of those things that we just wanted to go all the way with it."

Rumors were spread that Shadows had lost his ability to scream due to throat surgery needed after Warped Tour 2003. However, producer Andrew Murdock put down these rumors by saying: "When I met the band after Sounding the Seventh Trumpet… Matt handed me the CD, and he said to me, 'This record's screaming. The record we want to make is going to be half-screaming and half-singing. I don't want to scream anymore… the record after that is going to be all singing.'"

Songs

"Burn It Down" was the first track written for "City of Evil". The song was released as the lead single from the album, but was received poorly by fans.

"Bat Country" was one of the breakout singles of 2005, reaching No. 2 on the Billboard Hot Mainstream Rock Tracks, No. 6 on the Billboard Modern Rock Tracks, and No. 1 on MTV's Total Request Live. 
"Trashed and Scattered" was released after "Burn It Down", and was also received poorly.

"Betrayed" is a tribute to Dimebag Darrell, the late guitarist of Pantera.

Videography
City of Evil features four music videos (one for each single). On May 4, 2005, the band released a promotional video for "Burn It Down", which was done in the same way as "Unholy Confessions" from Waking the Fallen (live footage with dubbed music). The video was directed by Nick Wickham. On July 28, 2005, their first professional video for a song on the album, "Bat Country", was released. It was directed by Marc Klasfeld. On February 6, 2006, "Beast and the Harlot" was released. This was a few weeks after it had been leaked on YouTube. It was directed by Tony Petrossian. On June 7, 2006, the music video for Seize the Day was released, and on June 30 it was released on Avenged Sevenfold's MySpace. The video was directed by Wayne Isham.

Reception

The album debuted at No. 30 on the Billboard 200 selling over 30,000 copies. Rolling Stone praised the guitar work, giving the album three out of a possible five stars. Johnny Loftus of Allmusic rated the album three-and-a-half stars out of five and commented "...Avenged Sevenfold gets all the pieces right, and sound like they're having more fun here than in the scattershot approach of the first couple records". The British version of the German magazine, Metal Hammer gave the album an eight out of ten rating with Katie Parsons concluding "They have done it their way, they're having fun and who the hell can blame them?".

In addition, "Bat Country" was one of the breakout singles of 2005, reaching No. 2 on the Billboard Hot Mainstream Rock Tracks, No. 6 on the Billboard Modern Rock Tracks, and No. 1 on MTV's Total Request Live. Additionally, the band won Best New Artist at the 2006 MTV Video Music Awards, beating out Rihanna, Panic! at the Disco, James Blunt, Angels & Airwaves and Chris Brown.

Track listing
All songs credited to Avenged Sevenfold.

In other media
Multiple City of Evil songs appeared in video games, notably by Electronic Arts and Activision. "Bat Country" appeared in EA Sports' Madden 06 and NHL 06, as well as SSX On Tour, which was produced by EA Sports label EA Sports BIG. It also appeared in Saints Row 2, Guitar Hero: Warriors of Rock, and Rocksmith 2014. However, the lyric "too many doses" has been replaced by "too many save me" to avoid drug content in a few games to keep the ESRB age rating down below. "Blinded in Chains" is the theme song for Blacklist member #14 Vince "Taz" Killic in Need For Speed: Most Wanted. "Beast and the Harlot" was featured in the soundtrack of the games Burnout Revenge, Guitar Hero II, Guitar Hero Smash Hits, Rock Band 3. and Rocksmith. The version featured in Guitar Hero II was a cover version, while the one featured in Smash Hits was a master recording.

Personnel
Personnel listing as adapted from album liner notes:

Avenged Sevenfold
 M. Shadows – lead vocals, backing vocals
 Zacky Vengeance – rhythm guitar, co-lead guitar, backing vocals, acoustic guitar on "Seize the Day", gang vocals on "Strength of the World"
 The Rev – drums, backing vocals, piano on "Seize the Day", gang vocals on "Strength of the World"
 Synyster Gates – lead guitar, backing vocals, piano on "Beast and the Harlot" and "Sidewinder", gang vocals on "Strength of the World"
 Johnny Christ – bass, backing vocals, gang vocals on "Strength of the World"

Production
Produced by Mudrock and Avenged Sevenfold, with additional production by Fred Archambault and Scott Gilman
Mixed by Andy Wallace
Pro Tools by John O'Mahony, assisted by Steve Sisco
Mastered by Eddie Schreyer
Additional vocal production by The Rev, Synyster Gates and M. Shadows
Orchestration by Scott Gilman, The Rev, Synyster Gates and M. Shadows
Drum tech – Mike Fasano
Guitar tech – Stephen Ferrara-Grand

Session musicians
Brian Haner  – additional guitars, pedal steel guitar, acoustic guitar solo left on "Sidewinder"

Orchestra
Violinists – Samuel Fischer (soloist), Mark Robertson, Songa Lee-Kitto, Sam Formicola, Bruce Dukov, Alan Grunfeld, Larry Greenfield, Liane Mautner
Violists – David Walther, Matthew Funes, Alma Fernandez
Cellists – Victor Lawrence (soloist), David Low, David Mergen

Choir
Choir leader – Jeannine Wagner
Choir performers – Zachary Biggs, Colton Beyer-Johnson, Josiah Yiu, Nathan Cruz, Stephen Cruz, C.J. Cruz, Sean Sullivan, Alan Hong, Nico Walsh, Sally Stevens

Charts

Weekly charts

Year-end charts

Certifications

References

2005 albums
Avenged Sevenfold albums
Progressive metal albums by American artists